Tetsuya Sato (born 26 March 1969) is a Japanese former professional tennis player.

Born in Kanagawa, Sato played on the professional tour in the 1990s and represented Japan in a total of three Davis Cup ties during his career.

At home he was a five-time national champion as a doubles player, winning his first All Japan Tennis Championships title in mixed doubles in 1990. From 1991 to 1995 he featured in five successive men's doubles finals, of which he won four.

Sato studied at Nihon University and won a silver medal for Japan at the 1991 Summer Universiade in Sheffield.

See also
List of Japan Davis Cup team representatives

References

External links
 
 
 

1969 births
Living people
Japanese male tennis players
Universiade medalists in tennis
Universiade silver medalists for Japan
Medalists at the 1991 Summer Universiade
Sportspeople from Kanagawa Prefecture
20th-century Japanese people